Alex Ifeanyi Mascot Ikwechegh is a Nigerian politician, businessman and philanthropist. He is the founder of GrossField Group, Alex Ikwechegh foundation and a former Local Government Chairman of Aba North, Abia State, Nigeria.

Early life and education
Ikwechegh is from Igbere, Bende Local Government Area, Abia State, Nigeria. He started his education at Constitution Crescent Primary School, Abia State, before moving to Hope Waddell Training Institution for his secondary education. He preceded to University of Calabar where he graduated with a degree in business management.

Career
Ikwechegh started his career as a politician by contesting successfully for the chairmanship of Aba North Local Government, Abia State, Nigeria. At age 28, he became the youngest politically elected chairman of a local government in Nigeria. Ikwechegh started GrossField Group as a construction, real estate, oil and gas company. Later in his career, he started Alex Ikwechegh Foundation providing educational support and relief materials for the less privileged and victims of social, artificial and natural disasters in Nigeria.

Awards and recognition
Ikwechegh received a chieftaincy title as Nkuma Dike Igbo Amaghi by Eze Igbo Ikeja, Lagos State, Nigeria. In 2018, he received Ndigbo Times Merit Award.

Personal life
Ikwechegh was born and raised in Igbere, Abia State, Nigeria. His father was Mascot Ukandu Ikwechegh, a businessman and philanthropist. His mother was Eunice Uzaru Ikwechegh.

References

Living people
People from Abia State
Nigerian philanthropists
Nigerian businesspeople
20th-century Nigerian businesspeople
21st-century Nigerian businesspeople
Hope Waddell Institute alumni
University of Calabar alumni
Year of birth missing (living people)